Rostokino is a railway yard of the Little Ring of the Moscow Railway. It is named after the Rostokino district where it is located. It was opened in 1908.
It was used by freight trains only although there was also passenger traffic in the middle of 20th century. In September 2016, the station of the Moscow Central Circle was opened.

See also 
Russian Railways

References 

Railway stations in Moscow
Railway stations of Moscow Railway
Railway stations in the Russian Empire opened in 1908
1908 establishments in the Russian Empire
Cultural heritage monuments of regional significance in Moscow